The 2017 Columbus Crew SC season was the club's twenty-second season of existence, and their twenty-second consecutive season in Major League Soccer, the top flight of American soccer. Columbus also competed in the U.S. Open Cup, and took part in the Carolina Challenge Cup during preseason. The season covered the period from October 24, 2016 to the start of the 2018 Major League Soccer season.

Crew SC won the Carolina Challenge Cup by going 2–1–0, defeating Seattle Sounders FC in the final game to clinch the title. On August 26, the club won the Lamar Hunt Pioneer Cup with a 2–1 victory over FC Dallas, their second straight year claiming the series and third time in five seasons.

Columbus finished fifth in the Eastern Conference, qualifying for the playoffs for the 14th time in club history. Crew SC eliminated Atlanta United and New York City FC, but fell 1–0 on aggregate to Toronto FC in the conference finals.

Non-competitive

Preseason

Midseason

Competitive

MLS

Standings

Eastern Conference

Overall table

Results summary

Results by round

Match results

Postseason

U.S. Open Cup

Statistics

Appearances and goals

Disciplinary record

Clean sheets

Transfers

In

Loan in

Out

Loan out

Awards

MLS Player of the Week

Postseason
Crew SC Team Awards
 Most Valuable Player – Federico Higuaín
 Golden Boot Winner – Ola Kamara
 Defender of the Year – Zack Steffen
 Humanitarian of the Year – Jonathan Mensah
 Kirk Urso Heart Award – Josh Williams
 Crew SC Academy Player of the Year – Jensen Lukacsko

Kits

See also
 Columbus Crew SC
 2017 in American soccer
 2017 Major League Soccer season

References

Columbus Crew seasons
Columbus Crew SC
Columbus Crew SC
Columbus Crew SC